Honda Type R models are special performance editions of their respective model families.

The design of Type R models was originally focused on race conditions, with an emphasis on minimizing weight, and maximizing performance potential (e.g. engine tuning, suspension set-up). Thus, Type R models were first conceived for racetracks.  However, due to Honda's increased focus on their VTEC engines, Type R vehicles were eventually designed for a much wider market.

Type R vehicles traditionally have a red Honda badge and Championship White paint as an option, as a tribute to their first winning F1 car.  Honda's racing and F1 cars often feature a red Honda badge.

The Type R was utilised by Acura on their high performance vehicles, which evolved into Type-S.

NSX Type R

Honda produced a very limited number of NSX Type R models from 1992 to 1995 for Japan. The NSX Type R was track oriented and, to reduce weight, lacked sound deadening, audio, electric windows and air conditioning. The NSX Type R's role was fulfilled by the NSX Type S Zero in 1997.

A second iteration of the Type R, dubbed NSX-R, was released in 2002, again exclusively in Japan. Under the body, panels and air fences in the front, along with a small rear diffuser, produced balanced downforce. These subtle changes along with its renowned handling kept the NSX-R competitive on the track against considerably higher-powered cars.

Integra Type R

DC2 Integra Type R

In 1995, Honda introduced their first Integra Type R to the Japanese Domestic Market (JDM).

The Integra Type R is equipped with a 1.8-liter DOHC VTEC in-line 4-cylinder (B18C) engine. JDM cars and cars sold in other international markets came with an 11:1 compression ratio whereas the US Integra Type R has a compression ratio of 10.6:1. There were numerous differences between the Type R engine and the DOHC VTEC engine available in other Integra models (GS-R) but the increased power was primarily due to the higher compression, larger throttle body, high-lift camshafts and high-volume exhaust manifold.
  
The Type R came only with a close-ratio 5-speed manual transmission. First gear and the final drive were identical to the GS-R transmission but gears two to four were spaced much closer. In addition, the Type R came equipped with a Helical limited-slip differential. In 1998, the JDM Type R and other international markets would receive a revised final drive ratio of 4.785 while the US Type R only had a 4.40 final drive ratio.

The focus of the Type R was to minimize weight while enhancing rigidity. The Type R has larger strut tower bars, rear performance rods on the rear frame and numerous body reinforcements. The Type R had revised springs and dampers as well as larger sway bars.

The 1995–1997 Type R has 4-lug 15 x 6 aluminum wheels wrapped in Bridgestone Potenza RE010 195/55R15 tires.  Larger rotors and calipers were included and the ABS system was revised as well. The 1998 JDM Type R would receive 5-lug 16-inch alloy wheels wrapped in 215/45/ZR16 tires.

Other features such as a moonroof, vanity mirrors, cruise control and a rear wiper were eliminated to save weight. Air conditioning was an option. The interior was revised as well to include a 10,000 rpm tachometer with an 8,400 rpm redline along with revised sport cloth seats and a titanium shift knob.

US Integra Type R
The Type R was introduced as a 1997 model to the US market under the Acura brand with the only option being air conditioning. In the US, the car would only be available in Championship White in 1997 and 1998. The Type R was not available for 1999 but returned in 2000 and remained until the end of DC2 production in 2001. Two colors were available for 2000 and 2001: Phoenix Yellow ('00-'01) and Flamenco Black Pearl ('00) or Nighthawk Black Pearl ('01).

The 1997 Integra Type R made  more than the Integra GS-R and was  lighter. At the time, the Integra Type R set the record for the most power per liter ( per liter) of a naturally aspirated piston engine ever produced for the US.

Production would be limited to 320 units in 1997 and 1,000 units in 1998, while 1,350 units were built for the US in 2000 and 1,158 in 2001. A total of 3,823 Integra Type R were produced.

DC2 Type R weight comparison
The below table lists the curb weights of the Integra Type R by model year (lbs).												
															

The below table shows the weight gains/losses due to the differences in parts between the Integra Type R and the Integra VTi-R as listed by Wheels magazine in 1994.					
					
					

Using the actual Wheels test weight of 1176 kg for VTi-R -40 kg listed, AuDM Type R weight reduction yields approximately a 1136 kg (2504 lb) curb weight.

It has been acclaimed by motoring journalists world-wide, including Evo magazine, who named the Type R "the greatest front-wheel-drive performance car ever" and TheAutoChannel.com, who also named it 'the best handling front-wheel drive car ever.'

DC5 Integra Type R

The DC5 Type R (Japanese market only) comes standard with a K20A  2.0-litre DOHC i-VTEC four-cylinder engine. The "i" in i-VTEC stands for intelligent VTEC, which employs VTC (Variable Timing Control) to advance the timing up to 50 degrees. The DC5 comes equipped with Recaro seats, four-piston Brembo front brakes, a close-ratio six-speed manual transmission, a limited-slip differential, and a stiffer suspension.

Accord Type R and Euro-R

The Honda Accord Type-R (ATR) was produced from 1998 to 2002 using the CH1 Accord chassis and sold in European markets. Only 3,789 units of this model were manufactured. The JDM Accord Euro-R uses the CL1 chassis. The Type-R Accord model is differentiated by features such as a stiffer suspension and chassis, Helical limited-slip-differential, twin-piston brakes, dual exhaust system, 17-inch alloy wheels, Xenon headlights, Recaro seats and a leather-trimmed Momo steering wheel.

The successor to the CL1 Accord Euro-R is the CL7 Accord Euro-R, produced from December 2002 to 2008 and built in Sayama, Japan for the JDM market. The engine run on 11.5:1 compression and has a redline of 8,300 rpm. It also has the standard Type R modifications, including Recaro seats, a limited-slip-differential and independent double wishbone suspension.

Civic Type R

The 1997 EK9 Civic was third to be given the Type R badge. Based on the EK4 SiR chassis, it features a Type R prepared B16B engine producing  along with a stiffer chassis, upgraded sway bars and strut bars, Recaro seats trimmed in Alcantara, 15-inch alloy wheels and a large boot spoiler. Since then, most generations have offered a Type R variant. The first generation Type R version of the Civic was the only version not offered outside Japan.

July 2015 saw the launch of the brand new Honda Civic Type-R, manufactured at their Swindon plant. The vehicle offers higher performance in the form of a direct-injected turbocharged 2.0 liter VTEC K20C1 petrol engine producing , and built in the United States at Honda's Anna Engine Plant in Anna, Ohio.

In May 2018, engineers at Honda's Swindon, UK factory developed a one off Civic Type R, the car called project P is a pickup truck, the performance and drivetrain are the same as the production Type R.

See also
 Honda in motorsport
 Honda in Formula One

References

Honda